Robert Grizha  (born 10 March 1982) is an Albanian former professional footballer who played as a defender.

Club career
He played as a defender for Partizani Tirana in the Albanian First Division.

In 2012, he controversially joined Lushnja on a one-year contract after Partizani also claimed to have reached an agreement with Grizha.

References

External links
 Lezha Sport

1982 births
Living people
People from Lezhë
Albanian footballers
Association football defenders
Besëlidhja Lezhë players
FK Partizani Tirana players
FC Vorskla Poltava players
Besa Kavajë players
KS Kastrioti players
KF Skënderbeu Korçë players
KS Shkumbini Peqin players
KS Lushnja players
Albanian expatriate footballers
Expatriate footballers in Ukraine
Albanian expatriate sportspeople in Ukraine